Train is a San Francisco pop rock band that formed in July 1994. The band originally consisted of lead vocalist/drummer Patrick Monahan and guitarist/bassist Rob Hotchkiss. Later, former Apostles members Jimmy Stafford and Charlie Colin playing guitar and bass, joined Train. At a later date, Scott Underwood joined Train, playing drums and keyboards.

The original lineup of five released two studio albums, their eponymous album, Train, which reached platinum, and their double-platinum album, Drops of Jupiter. As the band was recording their third album, later to go platinum, My Private Nation, Rob Hotchkiss left in late 2002, to pursue a solo career, after recording six tracks that would later be on the album. Soon after, bassist Charlie Colin, left Train in October 2003.

For a short time, Train was a trio in 2003. They recruited bassist Johnny Colt, former member of The Black Crowes, and keyboardist Brandon Bush, late in the same year. For touring, the band also recruited guitar player Tony Lopacinski. Lopacinski never took part in recording an album with the band. The remaining five members released the band's fourth studio album on January 31, 2006, titled For Me, It's You. After the tour for the album, Tony Lopacinski left the band.

The band decided to go on hiatus in November 2006. In May 2009, during the recording of their fifth studio album, Johnny Colt and Brandon Bush decided to depart from Train and the band became a trio once again. On October 27, 2009, the trio released their fifth studio album, entitled Save Me, San Francisco, their first new album in nearly four years. Since May 2009, Hector Maldonado (bass/vocals/guitar/percussion) and Jerry Becker (keyboards/guitar) have been part of the touring and recording group. On April 13, 2012, the band released their sixth studio album, California 37. That same year, Sakai Smith and Nikita Houston started touring with the band as backing singers, and also Drew Shoals joined the band as a new drummer, Underwood switched to keyboards and Becker took over guitar duties.

In June 2014, Scott Underwood left the band. After Underwood's departure, the band went on to release their seventh studio album on September 12, 2014, titled Bulletproof Picasso. Their eighth studio album, a special Christmas album titled Christmas in Tahoe was released on November 13, 2015. A few months later on June 3, 2016, the band released their ninth studio album, a cover album of Led Zeppelin songs titled Train Does Led Zeppelin II.

In October 2016, shortly after the release of their ninth studio album, Jimmy Stafford announced that he would be becoming only a part-time member of the band. This led to Luis Maldonado joining the band as a full-time guitarist. On January 27, 2017, the band released their tenth studio album titled A Girl, a Bottle, a Boat. Stafford eventually decided to leave the band for good a few months later in mid-2017. Currently, Pat Monahan is the only founding member of the band left.

Current lineup

Former members

Timeline

Discography

 Train (1998)
 Drops of Jupiter (2001)
 My Private Nation (2003)
 For Me, It's You (2006)
 Save Me San Francisco (2009)
 California 37 (2012)
 Bulletproof Picasso (2014)
 Christmas in Tahoe (2015)
 Train Does Led Zeppelin II (2016)
 A Girl, a Bottle, a Boat (2017)
 AM Gold (2022)

Band lineups

Notes

Train